Ptosanthus planifrons is a species of tephritid or fruit flies in the genus Ptosanthus of the family Tephritidae.

Distribution
Ethiopia, Uganda, Kenya, South Africa.

References

Tephritinae
Insects described in 1869
Diptera of Africa